Why Must I Die? is a 1960 American crime drama film directed by Roy Del Ruth and starring Terry Moore and Debra Paget. It was released by American International Pictures as a double feature with The Jailbreakers. This was director Roy Del Ruth's final film.

Plot
Lois King keeps her troubled past from nightclub owner Kenny Randall, who hires her to sing at his club, The Cockatoo, and has fallen in love with her.

Lois is blackmailed by Eddie, the ex-partner of her father, Red, who is in prison. Eddie and a female safecracker, Dottie Manson, will see to it that Red's sentence is extended to life unless Lois helps them rob the nightclub.

Kenny accidentally comes across the burglars and is killed. Lois finds his body and is arrested and falsely convicted for his murder.

Lois is on death row when Dottie is brought to the prison. By the time other inmates can convince Dottie to confess to killing Kenny, the execution has been carried out.

Cast
Terry Moore as Lois King
Debra Paget as Dottie Manson
Bert Freed as Adler
Juli Reding as Mitzi
Lionel Ames as Eddie Rainey

References

External links

1960 films
1960 crime drama films
1960s English-language films
American black-and-white films
American crime drama films
American International Pictures films
Films about capital punishment
Films directed by Roy Del Ruth
Films scored by Richard LaSalle
1960s American films